Adam Kokoszka (born 6 October 1986) is a Polish professional footballer who plays as a centre back. Besides Poland, he has played in Italy and Russia.

Club career
His debut for Wisła Kraków came on 4 August 2006 against Arka Gdynia.

On 28 July 2008 he signed a five-year contract with Empoli, using the Webster ruling to leave Wisla. Wisla brought the matter to FIFA but in October the organization cleared Kokoszka to play for Empoli. He debuted for his new club in a 4-0 win over U.S. Sassuolo Calcio on 28 October.

On 19 January 2011 a half-year loan transfer to Polonia Warsaw was announced.

In July 2014, Kokoszka signed a three-year contract with FC Torpedo Moscow, however in April 2015, Kokoszka left Torpedo Moscow having not been paid by the club for four months.

International career
Although he had made only a few appearances for his club, he was noticed by Leo Beenhakker and debuted for the Poland national football team a short while later, in a friendly away to the United Arab Emirates on 6 December 2006. In the next friendly match against Estonia he scored his first goal for Poland. He was called up for Euro 2008 and made one appearance, in Poland's final match against Croatia.

Poland goals

Notes

External links
 
 National team stats
 

1986 births
Living people
Polish footballers
Poland international footballers
Polish expatriate sportspeople in Italy
Polish expatriate footballers
Empoli F.C. players
Wisła Kraków players
Polonia Warsaw players
Śląsk Wrocław players
Zagłębie Sosnowiec players
UEFA Euro 2008 players
People from Andrychów
Ekstraklasa players
III liga players
IV liga players
Serie B players
Expatriate footballers in Italy
Sportspeople from Lesser Poland Voivodeship
FC Torpedo Moscow players
Russian Premier League players
Expatriate footballers in Russia
Association football defenders